The 20th Actors and Actresses Union Awards ceremony was held on 31 October 2011 at the Teatro Circo Price in Madrid.

In addition to the competitive awards the Argentine association 'Mothers of the Plaza de Mayo' received the '' award, Asunción Balaguer the '' career award and the Special Award went to the Teatro Circo Prince (the recurring venue of the awards).

Winners and nominees 
The winners and nominees are listed as follows:

Film

Television

Theatre

Newcomers

References 

Actors and Actresses Union Awards
2011 in Madrid
2011 television awards
2011 film awards
2011 theatre awards
October 2011 events in Europe